The LP World Tour 2009 was the fifth concert tour by Italian singer Laura Pausini, starting in Brescia on 28 February 2009 and ending in Milan on 23 December 2009. This tour was in support of Pausini's album Primavera in anticipo / Primavera anticipada which was released in 2008.

It reached Europe and the Americas. It was the longest world tour made by Pausini in her career so far.

Background 
During 2008, the singer announced about touring a whole year during 2009 from February to December, which gives her performances in Italy, Europe and the Americas. The tour took place in important cities like Madrid, Barcelona, Paris, Zürich, Geneva, Helsinki, Turku, Stockholm, Brussels and others. Then, made a few stops on North American cities, such as Dominican Republic, United States, Canada and Mexico; continues to South America reaching Argentina, Chile, Peru and Brasil.

To conclude the tour, she returned to Italy and performed during November–December and finally end the promotion. Due to the massive sold-out shows and tickets demand for the tour, the World Tour 2009 took place in Milan during six nights, five in Rome; the shows in Turin and Florence were triplicated while in Bologna, Brescia, Morrone del Sannio, Catania, Eboli, Mantua and Treviso were duplicated to please the demand.

Broadcast and recordings 

Laura Live was anticipated by the release of Laura Pausini's single Con la musica alla radio on 25 September 2009. The DVD presents recordings from shows in particular nights and countries. It has the most of the show recorded in Italian and Spanish. For hispanoamerican countries the CD+DVD release comes with a CD that includes Spanish tracks and the DVD recorded between Italian and Spanish songs.

Also, extra features present three inedit songs with their respective video and a backstage video of the tour.

Setlist 
The repertory presents variations in every continent.

Tour dates 

Cancellations and rescheduled shows

Box office score data (Billboard)

Band 
 Paolo Carta – guitar / musical director
 Emiliano Bassi – drums
 Bruno Zucchetti – keyboards
 Mateo Bassi – bass
 Gabriele Fersini – guitar
 Gianluigi Fazio – background vocals
 Emanuela Cortesi – background vocals
 Roberta Granà – background vocals

References 
(*) Pulse Music Board – Billboard Boxscore 20 June 2009

(**) Pulse Music Board – Billboard Boxscore 21 November 2009

(***) Pulse Music Board – Billboard Boxscore 7 November 2009

(****) Pulse Music Board – Billboard Boxscore 14 November 2009

External links 
 Laura Pausini – Official Website

2009 concert tours
Laura Pausini concert tours

it:Tour di Laura Pausini#World Tour 2009